Conrad IV, Count of Rietberg ( – 21 June 1428) was Count of Rietberg from 1389 until his death.

He was the son of Count Otto II of Rietberg and his wife Adelheid of Lippe.  He inherited the County of Rietberg when his father died on 18 July 1389.

Death
Conrad died on 21 June 1428.  He was buried in the family grave of the Counts of Rietberg in Marienfeld Abbey.  He shared a tomb stone with his wife Irmgard:
 Anno Dni. MCCCCXXVI 9 Kal. April. obiit
 Nobilis Ermegardis comitissa de Retberge,
 Cuius anima requiescat in pace. Amen †
 Anno Dni. MCCCCXXVIII XII Kal. Jun. obiit
 nobilis Conradus comes de Retberghe.
 Cuius anim req. In p. †

In English translation:
 In the year of our Lord 1426, on 24 March,
 The noble wife Irmgard, Countess of Rietberg died.
 May her soul rest in peace.  Amen.
 In the year of our Lord 1428, on 21 June,
 The noble Lord Conrad, Count of Rietberg died.
 May his soul rest in peace

Marriage and issue
On 24 April 1399, he married Irmgard (d. 24 March 1426), a daughter of John of Diepholz (d. 1422) and Kunigunde of Oldenburg. With her he had three children:
 Conrad V ( – 31 October 1472), succeeded Conrad IV as Count of Rietberg
 John (mentioned  between 1415 and 1452)
 Adelaide of Rietberg (d. 1436/1439), married Count Otto of Hoya (d. after 14 May 1436)

Some sources say that Conrad IV was also married to Beatrix of Bronckhorst (d. 1392).

References
 ,

External links
https://web.archive.org/web/20090504201741/http://www.kaunitz-rietberg.de/rietberg/konrad_iv.html
http://finnholbek.dk/genealogy/familygroup.php?familyID=F11440&tree=2

Footnotes

Counts of Rietberg
1371 births
1428 deaths
14th-century German nobility
15th-century German nobility